Ampullaceana lagotis is a species of freshwater gastropods belonging to the family Lymnaeidae.

The species is found in Eurasia.

References

Lymnaeidae
Gastropods described in 1803
Freshwater snails
Gastropods of Asia
Gastropods of Europe